The Washington Suburban Sanitary Commission (WSSC Water) is a bi-county political subdivision of the State of Maryland that provides safe drinking water and wastewater treatment for Montgomery and Prince George's Counties in Maryland except for a few cities in both counties that continue to operate their own water facilities.

The Commission is one of the largest water and wastewater utilities in the United States. WSSC serves about 1.8 million people in an approximately  area.

Operations
A bi-county agency, WSSC Water has extensive regulatory functions. It promulgates and enforces the plumbing code for its jurisdiction as well as reviews and approves contract plans for extensions of water and sewer mains.  The agency operates 3 reservoirs (plus shared access to a fourth reservoir), 2 drinking water filtration plants, and 6 wastewater treatment plants. It also collects wastewater which is treated at the Blue Plains Advanced Wastewater Treatment Plant (operated by DC Water) in Washington, D.C.

Facilities

Reservoirs
 T. Howard Duckett Reservoir
 Triadelphia Reservoir
 Little Seneca Lake

Drinking water filtration plants
 Patuxent 
 Potomac 
 Robert Morse (in operation 1936-1962)

Water Resource Recovery Facilities

Management
WSSC Water is overseen by six commissioners, three from Montgomery County and three from Prince George's County. These commissioners are appointed by their respective county executives with the approval of the county councils. The day-to-day operations are the responsibility of a general manager/chief executive officer, who supervises a staff of over 1,700. The Commission's budget information can be found here. The agency's headquarters office is located in Laurel, Maryland.

History
In 1911, Asa Phillips, sanitary engineer for the District of Columbia, convened a meeting with local residents to discuss the problem of Montgomery and Prince George's counties polluting the streams that flowed into the District. The pollution of the streams was a major health concern for the residents of the District of Columbia. The people at the meeting advised the Maryland General Assembly that a study of the problem was needed. The Assembly passed a bill authorizing the Governor of Maryland to appoint a study commission in 1912. 

As a result of the recommendation of the study commission, Maryland Delegate Paul Waters introduced a bill to establish the Washington Suburban Sanitary Commission, and the General Assembly passed the bill on April 8, 1916. WSSC was originally created to study the drainage situation in Montgomery and Prince George's counties and to recommend the best possible sewage system.

In 1918, the Commission released its report, written by Robert B. Morse and Harry Hall, to the General Assembly. The report recommended establishing a permanent Washington Suburban Sanitary Commission as a bi-county agency for water and sewage. The report included a plan for construction for the next 22 years. T. Howard Duckett drafted a law officially establishing WSSC as a permanent bi-county agency. Following lobbying by E. Brooke Lee, the law was passed, effective May 1, 1918. William T.S. Curtis of Montgomery County, Emory H. Bogley of Montgomery County, and Duckett of Prince George's County were named commissioners.

Duckett visited Elizabeth, New Jersey, which had financed its sewage plan by having a front-foot benefit charge and a land tax, with the house connections installed at the cost of each property owner. WSSC requested a similar arrangement in Maryland, and the county governments certified the levy in March 1919, using the rate of $0.015 per $100 of assessed property.

Drinking water facilities
In 1919 WSSC purchased the Takoma Park water system, which drew water from Sligo Creek. To provide additional capacity, the commission bought a used water filtration plant from Culpeper, Virginia, and installed the system along the Northwest Branch near Burnt Mills. This facility was replaced with a new system, the Robert B. Morse Water Filtration Plant, in the 1930s. Later, a pipeline was built to bring water from the Patuxent River at Mink Hollow to the filtration plant in Burnt Mills. Triadelphia Reservoir was built on the Patuxent and opened in 1943. 

In 1944, the Patuxent River Filtration Plant was built near Laurel. The T. Howard Duckett Dam and Reservoir was completed in 1952, adding more capacity. The 2022 average delivery level for the Patuxent plant is 57 mgd. The Potomac River drinking water plant opened in 1961, with an initial capacity of 30 mgd. The 2022 average delivery level is 120 mgd.

Sewage treatment facilities
WSSC connected its trunk sewers near Washington, DC into the Blue Plains system beginning in the 1930s, as the treatment plant began operation. The commission built its first sewage treatment plant in Bladensburg in the 1940s; in the 1950s this plant was closed as additional connections were made to the Blue Plains system. Most of the WSSC sewers in Montgomery County are now served by the Blue Plains plant, except for the northern portion of the county, which is served by the Seneca plant, which opened in the 1970s. In Prince George's County, the Parkway plant was built in the 1950s, followed by the Piscataway and Western Branch plants in the 1960s.

References

External links

1916 establishments in Maryland
Government agencies established in 1916
Laurel, Maryland
Local government in Maryland
Public utilities of the United States
Water companies of the United States